Cladiella is a genus of soft corals native to the Indo-Pacific region. They grow fast, have short rounded or conical lobes and are sticky to the touch owing to the production of much mucus. They are creamy or pale grey in colour. The polyps are fully retractable and give the colony a fluffy look when extended. They may be a contrasting green or brown hue.

Species
The World Register of Marine Species lists the following species:

Cladiella arborea (Utinomi, 1954)
Cladiella arbusculoides Verseveldt & Benayahu, 1978
Cladiella aspera Tixier-Durivault, 1970
Cladiella australis (Macfadyen, 1936)
Cladiella bottai (Tixier-Durivault, 1943)
Cladiella brachyclados Ehrenberg, 1834
Cladiella ceylonica (Pratt, 1905)
Cladiella conifera (Tixier-Durivault, 1943)
Cladiella crassa (Tixier-Durivault, 1943)
Cladiella daphnae van Ofwegen & Benayahu, 1992
Cladiella densa Tixier-Durivault, 1970
Cladiella devaneyi Verseveldt, 1977
Cladiella digitulatum (Klunzinger, 1877)
Cladiella dollfusi (Tixier-Durivault, 1943)
Cladiella echinata (Tixier-Durivault, 1943)
Cladiella elegantissima (May, 1899)
Cladiella elongata (Tixier-Durivault, 1944)
Cladiella exigua (Tixier-Durivault, 1944)
Cladiella foliacea (Tixier-Durivault, 1944)
Cladiella germaini (Tixier-Durivault, 1942)
Cladiella globulifera (Klunzinger, 1877)
Cladiella globuliferoides (Thomson & Dean, 1931)
Cladiella gracilis (Tixier-Durivault, 1944)
Cladiella hartogi Benayahu & Chou, 2010
Cladiella hicksoni (Tixier-Durivault, 1944)
Cladiella hirsuta Tixier-Durivault, 1970
Cladiella humesi Verseveldt, 1974
Cladiella irregularis (Tixier-Durivault, 1944)
Cladiella kashmani Benayahu & Schleyer, 1996
Cladiella klunzingeri Thomson & Simpson, 1909
Cladiella krempfi (Hickson, 1919)
Cladiella kukenthali (Tixier-Durivault, 1942)
Cladiella laciniosa (Tixier-Durivault, 1944)
Cladiella latissima (Tixier-Durivault, 1944)
Cladiella letourneuxi (Tixier-Durivault, 1944)
Cladiella lineata (Tixier-Durivault, 1944)
Cladiella madagascarensis (Tixier-Durivault, 1944)
Cladiella michelini (Tixier-Durivault, 1944)
Cladiella minuta (Tixier-Durivault, 1944)
Cladiella multiloba Tixier-Durivault, 1970
Cladiella pachyclados (Klunzinger, 1877)
Cladiella papillosa Tixier-Durivault, 1942
Cladiella pauciflora Ehrenberg, 1834
Cladiella prattae (Tixier-Durivault, 1944)
Cladiella pulchra (Tixier-Durivault, 1944)
Cladiella ramosa Tixier-Durivault, 1970
Cladiella rotundata Tixier-Durivault, 1970
Cladiella scabra Tixier-Durivault, 1970
Cladiella similis (Tixier-Durivault, 1944)
Cladiella sphaerophora (Ehrenberg, 1834)
Cladiella steineri Verseveldt, 1982
Cladiella studeri (Tixier-Durivault, 1944)
Cladiella subtilis Tixier-Durivault, 1970
Cladiella suezensis (Tixier-Durivault, 1944)
Cladiella tenuis (Tixier-Durivault, 1944)
Cladiella thomsoni (Tixier-Durivault, 1944)
Cladiella tualerensis (Tixier-Durivault, 1944)
Cladiella tuberculoides (Tixier-Durivault, 1944)
Cladiella tuberculosa (Quoy & Gaimard, 1833)
Cladiella tuberosa (Tixier-Durivault, 1944)
Cladiella variabilis (Tixier-Durivault, 1944)

References

Alcyoniidae
Octocorallia genera